Allocasuarina ramosissima is a shrub of the genus Allocasuarina native to a small area in the western Wheatbelt  region of Western Australia.

It is found gravelly lateritic soils.

References

External links
  Occurrence data for Allocasuarina ramosissima from The Australasian Virtual Herbarium

ramosissima
Rosids of Western Australia
Fagales of Australia
Dioecious plants